The sixth Women's U.S. Cup tournament held in 2000, were joined by four teams: Canada, South Korea, Mexico and USA. The tournament was in a knockout format, with all matches played in the Civic Stadium in Portland, Oregon.

Matches

Final placing

Goal scorers

References 

2000
U.S.
U.S.
Soccer in Oregon
2000 in sports in Oregon
2000 in Canadian soccer
2000 in South Korean football
1999–2000 in Mexican football
2000 in Portland, Oregon
May 2000 sports events in the United States